"In the Summertime" is a 1970 song by British rock band Mungo Jerry.

In the Summertime may also refer to:

 "In the Summertime" (Thirsty Merc song)
 "On the Beach (In the Summertime)", a 1970 song by The 5th Dimension
 "In the Summertime", a 1965 song by Roger Miller from The Return of Roger Miller
 "In the Summertime", a 1981 song by Bob Dylan from Shot of Love
 "In the Summertime", a 2007 song by Phunk Junkeez from Hydro Phonic
 In the Summertime, a 2008 album by The Wrights

See also
 Summertime (disambiguation)
 Sunny Afternoon, song by the Kinks featuring "In the summertime" as a tag line